Obame is a surname. Notable people with the surname include:

André Mba Obame (1957–2015), Gabonese politician
Anthony Obame (born 1988), Gabonese taekwondo practitioner
Erwin Nguéma Obame (born 1989), Gabonese footballer

See also
Obama (surname)